Ancyluris is a butterfly genus in the family Riodinidae. They are resident in the Neotropics.

Species list 

 Ancyluris aristodorus (Morisse, 1838) French Guiana, Ecuador
 Ancyluris aulestes (Cramer, 1777) French Guiana, Guyana, Suriname, Bolivia, Colombia, Ecuador, Brazil, Peru
 A. a. aulestes Suriname, Brazil, Peru
 A. a. eryxo (Saunders, 1859) Bolivia Peru
 A. a. jocularis Stichel, 1909 Colombia, Ecuador
 A. a. pandama (Saunders, 1850) Brazil
 Ancyluris colubra (Saunders, 1859) Venezuela, Brazil, Peru
 Ancyluris etias (Saunders, 1859) Bolivia, Suriname, Peru
 A. e. etias Peru
 A. e. gracilis Stichel, 1910 Suriname
 A. e. mendita (Druce, 1904) Bolivia
 Ancyluris formosissima (Hewitson, 1870) Ecuador, Peru
 A. f. formosissima Ecuador
 A. f. venerabilis Stichel, 1916 Peru
 Ancyluris inca (Saunders, 1850) Mexico, Panama, Colombia, Ecuador, Bolivia, Peru
 A. i. inca Mexico Panama
 A. i. cacica (C. & R. Felder, 1865) Colombia, Peru
 A. i. formosa (Hewitson, 1870) Ecuador
 A. i. huascar (Saunders, 1859) Colombia, Ecuador
 A. i. miranda (Hewitson, 1874) Bolivia, Peru
 A. i. pulchra (Hewitson, 1870) Ecuador
 Ancyluris jurgensenii (Saunders, 1850) Mexico, Panama, Colombia
 A. j. jurgensenii Mexico, Panama
 A. j. atahualpa (Saunders, 1859) Colombia
 Ancyluris meliboeus (Fabricius, 1777)
 A. m. meliboeus French Guiana, Suriname, Brazil, Peru
 A. m. euaemon Stichel, 1910 Colombia, Bolivia, Peru
 A. m. julia (Saunders, 1850) Brazil
 Ancyluris melior Stichel, 1910 Brazil, Peru
 Ancyluris miniola (Bates, 1868) Brazil
 Ancyluris mira (Hewitson, 1874) Colombia, Ecuador, Bolivia, Peru
 A. m. mira Bolivia, Peru
 A. m. furia Stichel, 1925 Colombia, Ecuador
 A. m. thaumasia Stichel, 1910 Bolivia
 Ancyluris paramba D'Abrera, 1994 Ecuador
 Ancyluris paetula Stichel, 1916 Peru
 Ancyluris rubrofilum Stichel, 1909 Bolivia
 Ancyluris tedea (Cramer, 1777) French Guiana, Guyana, Suriname, Bolivia, Peru
 A. t. tedea Suriname
 A. t. silvicultrix Stichel, 1909 Bolivia, Peru

Sources 
 Ancyluris

External links
images representing Ancyluris at Encyclopedia of Life
images representing Ancyluris at Consortium for the Barcode of Life

Riodininae
Butterfly genera
Taxa named by Jacob Hübner